{{DISPLAYTITLE:C5H7NOS}}
The molecular formula C5H7NOS (molar mass: 129.18 g/mol, exact mass: 129.0248 u) may refer to:

 Goitrin
 Penam